Prairie Spotlight was a Canadian current affairs television series which aired on CBC Television in 1964.

Premise
This Winnipeg-produced series featured topics concerning western Canada such as the economy, housing, and tourism. In late 1964, it became part of CBC's Across Canada series.

Scheduling
This half-hour series was broadcast on Wednesdays at 6:30 p.m. (Eastern) from 1 July to 14 October 1964.

References

External links
 

CBC Television original programming
1964 Canadian television series debuts
1964 Canadian television series endings
Black-and-white Canadian television shows